The 2008 Men's Asia Pacific Floorball Championships are the fifth such championships in men's floorball. It was held from August 25 to August 29, 2008 in the suburb of Leederville in Perth, Australia. All matches were held at the Loftus Recreation Centre. Singapore captured the 2008 Asia Pacific Floorball Championship by defeating Australia in the finals.

The 2008 Men's Asia Pacific Floorball Championships were the first to be held outside of Singapore City.

The tournament is organised by the Asia Oceania Floorball Confederation (AOFC).

Championship results

Preliminary round

August 25, 2008

August 26, 2008

August 27, 2008

Playoffs

Semi-finals

Bronze-medal match

Gold-medal match

Standings
Official Rankings according to the AOFC

|-style="text-align: center; background: #ffa07a;"
|align="center" colspan="3"|Asia Pacific Floorball Championships

See also
Asia Oceania Floorball Confederation
List of Asia Pacific Floorball Champions

External links
Official APAC 2008 Website

Mens Asia Pacific Floorball Championships, 2008
Floorball competitions